Jumhūriyyah is the word for "republic" in the Arabic language. Loanwords representing variations of the term also exist in other language families, especially Turkic.

States known officially as Jumhūriyyah:
current
Republic of Turkey (1923)
Republic of Lebanon (Al-Jumhūriyyah al-Lubnānīyah) (1943)
Tunisian Republic (Al-Jumhūrīyah at-Tūnisīyah) (1956)
Islamic Republic of Pakistan (Islāmī Jumhūriyah-yi Pākistān) (1956)
Republic of Sudan (Jumhūrīyat as-Sūdān) (1956)
Democratic Republic of the Congo (1960)
 Republic of Chad (Jumhūrīyat Tshād) (1960)
Islamic Republic of Mauritania (Al-Jumhūrīyah al-Islāmīyah al-Mūrītānīyah (1960)
Arab Republic of Egypt (Jumhūrīyat Miṣr al-ʻArabīyah) (1961)
Syrian Arab Republic (Al-Jumhūrīyah al-ʻArabīyah as-Sūrīyah) (1961)
People's Democratic Republic of Algeria (Al-Jumhūrīyah al-Jazairāh ad-Dimuqrāṭiyya aš-Šaʾbiyya) (1962)
Republic of Uganda (1962)
Republic of Kenya (1964)
United Republic of Tanzania (1964)
Republic of Maldives ( Dhivehi Raajjeyge Jumhooriyya) (1965)
Sahrawi Arab Democratic Republic  (Al-Jumhūrīyah al-‘Arabīyah aṣ-Ṣaḥrāwīyah ad-Dīmuqrāṭīyah) (1976, partially recognized)
Republic of Djibouti (Jumhūrīyat Jībūtī) (1977)
Islamic Republic of Iran (Jomhuri-ye Eslāmi-ye Irān) (1979)
Turkish Republic of Northern Cyprus (1983, partially recognized)
Republic of Yemen (Al-Jumhūrīyah al-Yamanīyah) (1990)
Republic of Somaliland (Jumhūrīyat Arḍ aṣ-Ṣūmāl) (1991, unrecognized)
Republic of Tajikistan (Jumhuriyi Tojikiston) (1991)
Republic of Iraq (Jumhūrīyat al-‘Irāq) (2004)
Federal Republic of Somalia (Jumhūrīyat aṣ-Ṣūmāl al-Fidirālīyah) (2012)
current sub-national units
Republic of Tatarstan (Tatarstan Cömhüriäte) (1991)
Republic of Bashkortostan (Başqortostan Yömhüriäte) (1991)
 Autonomous Republic of Crimea (Qırım Muhtar Cumhuriyeti) (1991, partially recognized)
Republic of Crimea (Qırım Cumhuriyeti) (2014, partially recognized)
historical 
Tripolitanian Republic (Al-Jumhūriyyah aṭ-Ṭrabulsiyyah) (1918-1922)
Persian Socialist Soviet Republic (Jomhuri-e Sosialisti-e Iran) (1920-1921)
Republic of Iran (Jomhuri-e Iran) (1923-1925)
Syrian Republic (Al-Jumhūrīyah as-Sūrīyah) (1930-1958)
United Islamic Republic of East Turkestan (Sherqiy Türkistan Islam Jumhuriyiti) (1933-1934)
East Turkestan Republic (Sherqiy Türkistan Jumhuriyiti) (1944-1946)
Republic of Egypt (Jumhūrīyat Miṣr) (1953-1958)
Iraqi Republic (Al-Jumhūrīyah al-‘Irāqīyah) (1958-1968)
United Arab Republic (Al-Jumhūriyyah al-‘Arabīyah al-Muttaḥidah) (1958-1961)
Yemen Arab Republic (Al-Jumhūrīyah al-‘Arabīyah al-Yamanīyah) (1962-1990)
People's Democratic Republic of Yemen (Jumhūrīyat al-Yaman ad-Dīmuqrāṭīyah ash-Sha‘bīyah) (1967-1990)
Iraqi Republic (Al-Jumhūrīyah al-‘Irāqīyah) (1968-2003)
Libyan Arab Republic (Al-Jumhūrīyah al-ʿArabiyyah al-Lībiyyah) (1969-1977)
Federation of Arab Republics (Ittiḥād al-Jumhūrīyāt al-‘Arabīyah) (1972–1977)
Arab Islamic Republic (Al-Jumhūrīyah al-ʿArabiyyah al-Islāmiyyah) (1974 proposal)
Great Socialist People's Libyan Arab Jamahiriya (Al-Jamāhīrīyah al-‘Arabīyah al-Lībīyah ash-Sha‘bīyah al-Ishtirākīyah al-‘Uẓmá) (1977-2011)
Free Lebanon State (Jumhūrīyat Lubnān al-Ḥurrah) (1979-1984)
Republic of Kuwait (Jumūrīyat al-Kuwait) (1990)
Democratic Republic of Yemen (Jumhūrīyat al-Yaman ad-Dīmuqrāṭīyah) (1994)

See also
List of republics
Jamhuri (disambiguation)
Jamahiriya (disambiguation)

Arabic words and phrases